Mahonia nervosa, commonly known as dwarf Oregon-grape, Cascade barberry, Cascade Oregon-grape, or dull Oregon-grape, is a flowering plant native to the northwest coast of North America from southern British Columbia south to central California, with an isolated population inland in northern Idaho. It is especially common in second growth, Douglas-fir or western redcedar forests, making use of those pools of sunlight that intermittently reach the ground.

Some authors place the entire genus Mahonia within the genus Berberis.

The plant was collected by Lewis and Clark during their famous expedition to the West before being described for science by Frederick T. Pursh in 1813.

Description

The leaves are compound and of opposite arrangement, with 9–19 leaflets; each leaflet is strongly toothed, reminiscent of holly, and somewhat shiny, but less so than tall Oregon-grape. The leaflets do not have a single central vein as in that species, but several veins arranged fan-like, branched from the leaflet base, hence the epithet nervosa.

Ecology 

Low Oregon-grape thrives in sun or shade and is a common or dominant species throughout the understories in montane, sub-montane, and mixed evergreen forests in the Pacific Northwest. It reaches greatest abundance on relatively dry and warm sites, but occurs in fairly moist environments as well. It grows in a variety of soil types.

Mahonia nervosa can complete its life cycle even in the deep shade of dense hemlock-western redcedar forests, so it is a climax species in old-growth forests where it is often dominant. It also occurs in disturbed sites, usually reaching peak abundance from 4 to 10 years after fire or clearcutting.

The plant can reproduce via seeds or by vegetative means, sprouting from rhizomes which extend laterally through the soil.

Its foliage is browsed by black-tailed deer and Roosevelt elk in some areas, but is ignored in others. Various small mammals feed on the foliage extensively, and it is extremely important food source for the white-footed vole in the Coast Range of Oregon. The fruits are eaten by small birds and mammals, and by black-tailed deer in some areas. The nectar of the genus Mahonia is favored by the Anna's hummingbird.

Uses
Some Plateau Indian tribes drank an infusion of the root to treat rheumatism. Modern medicine uses it against parasites, bacteria, viruses, diabetes, and high cholesterol.

The Yana people dried and ground the fruits to make a mush. They can also be dried and eaten like raisins, or used for jelly.

The inner bark is colored yellow by the alkaloid berberine, and was used as a dye by native groups.

The leaves are often used in floral arrangements.

References

External links

Flora of North America (as Berberis nervosa)
Jepson Flora Project (as Berberis nervosa)

nervosa
Flora of the Northwestern United States
Flora of British Columbia
Flora of California
Flora of the Klamath Mountains
Natural history of the California Coast Ranges
Plants described in 1813
Plants used in traditional Native American medicine
Garden plants of North America
Bird food plants
Flora without expected TNC conservation status